Béthencourt-sur-Somme (literally Béthencourt on Somme) is a commune in the Somme department in Hauts-de-France in northern France.

Geography

Population

History
It was here that King Henry V found a crossing point over the river Somme in 1415, just days before the Battle of Agincourt.

See also
Communes of the Somme department

References

Communes of Somme (department)